Anthony Linden Jones (born 1959 in Sydney, Australia)  is a composer, conductor and performer living in the Hawkesbury region, on the north west fringe of Sydney.

He composes for concert pieces, film scores, songs, music for theatre and dance, and electronic works. He has written works for solo instruments up to full orchestra and written songs in a broad range of genre. His pieces have received a number of awards, performances, broadcasts and CD recordings. A number of the films he has scored have attracted awards and showings in international festivals and cable networks.

He conducts the Chorella a cappella choir, based in the Hawkesbury region, with an interest in Renaissance, folk and gospel music. He also directs world music vocal ensembles.

As a performer, he has experience in a very broad range of genre on violin, voice, guitar, double bass, keyboards and percussion. He is a coordinator of the Hawkesbury National Fiddle Festival, and recently formed the Fiddlefest String Quartet. He performed through the 1990s with the folk group The Ragged Band, appearing at many of the national folk festivals in Australia, touring Japan and releasing 2 CDs.

External links
 Official Site
 

Australian male composers
Australian composers
1959 births
Living people